Wanamassa (YTB-820) is a United States Navy  named for Wanamassa, New Jersey.

Construction

The contract for Wanamassa was awarded 9 August 1971. She was laid down on 28 October 1972 at Marinette, Wisconsin, by Marinette Marine and launched 4 May 1973.

Operational history

Delivered to the U.S. Navy on 28 July 1973, Wanamassa was initially assigned to the 10th Naval District and operated out of San Juan, Puerto Rico, aiding ships in berthing and docking maneuvers and standing ready to provide waterfront fire protection.

In the latter half of the 1970s, she was transferred to the Guantanamo Bay Naval Base, in Cuba. She remained in active service at Guantanamo as late as April 2015.
The three Natick class tugs at Guantanamo remain among the last five to remain in service.

References

External links
 

 

Natick-class large harbor tugs
Ships built by Marinette Marine
1973 ships
Ships of the United States